The Cincinnati Riverfest (officially the Western & Southern/WEBN Fireworks) is an annual festival that takes place on Labor Day weekend on the Ohio River at Cincinnati. It has taken place annually since 1977. The highlight of the event, the fireworks display at 9:05 PM, is one of the largest in the Midwest. The festival's corporate sponsors are WEBN (102.7 FM) and Western & Southern Financial Group.

History
The fireworks display was first organized in 1977 to celebrate the 10-year anniversary of rock and roll radio station WEBN. It has now evolved into an all-day event is held every year on the day before Labor Day. Cincinnati Bell sponsored Riverfest from 2007 to 2014, when it was known as the Cincinnati Bell/WEBN Riverfest.

In 2020, due to the ongoing COVID-19 pandemic, Riverfest was cancelled. However, the fireworks still went on as usual, but in an undisclosed location. It was revealed to be the Kentucky Speedway.

Activities
Riverfest is filled with many activities, including the Rubber Duck Regatta, in which hundreds of thousands of rubber ducks are released into the Ohio River to benefit the Freestore Foodbank. The festival ends with a gathering on the banks of the Ohio River in Cincinnati, Ohio, Covington, Kentucky, and Newport, Kentucky to watch a half-hour fireworks show set to an underscore heard on WEBN. The fireworks are provided by Rozzi's Famous Fireworks Inc. The show attracts nearly 500,000 to the area every year. Over 2,500 boats jam the river to get a front row seat for the show, and the river is patrolled by the United States Coast Guard, Kentucky Department of Fish and Wildlife Resources, Ohio Department of Natural Resources, and local units from Cincinnati and Covington. The river is normally closed between the Roebling Suspension Bridge and the "Big Mac" (Interstate 471) bridge.

References

External links 
 
 
 Rubber Duck Regatta

Festivals in Cincinnati
Festivals in Kentucky
Ohio River
September events
1977 establishments in Kentucky
Annual events in Ohio
Music festivals established in 1977
Fireworks in the United States
1977 establishments in Ohio